Garrymore GAA is a Gaelic football club in Killeenrevagh, County Mayo, Ireland. They won the Connacht Senior Club Football Championship in 1981. Notable players include Enda Varley and Noel Tierney (who also played with Milltown). After many years of success in the 70's and 80's Garrymore have become a well-known club in Connaught.

Honours 
 All-Ireland Senior Club Football Championship:
 Runner-Up 1982
Connacht Senior Club Football Championship: 1
1981
 Mayo Senior Football Championship: 6
 1974, 1975, 1976, 1979, 1981, 1982

Notable players
 Enda Varley
 Noel Tierney
 Tony Corcoran
 Billy Fitzpatrick

References

External links 
Official site
Facebook page

Gaelic games clubs in County Mayo
Gaelic football clubs in County Mayo